Eupithecia helena is a moth in the family Geometridae. It is found from Arizona and New Mexico, through Utah to Montana.

The wingspan is about 18 mm. Adults have been recorded on wing from July to August.

References

Moths described in 1906
helena
Moths of North America